This list of cemeteries in Mississippi includes currently operating, historical (closed for new interments), and defunct (graves abandoned or removed) cemeteries, columbaria, and mausolea which are historical and/or notable. It does not include pet cemeteries.

Adams County 
 Cemetery Bluff District, Natchez; NRHP-listed
 Natchez National Cemetery, Natchez; NRHP-listed

Alcorn County 
 Corinth National Cemetery, Corinth; NRHP-listed

Claiborne County 
 Grand Gulf Cemetery at Grand Gulf Military State Park, Port Gibson; NRHP-listed
 Jewish Cemetery, Port Gibson; NRHP-listed
 Wintergreen Cemetery, Port Gibson; NRHP-listed

Grenada County 
 Odd Fellows and Confederate Cemetery, Grenada; NRHP-listed

Harrison County 
 Biloxi National Cemetery, Biloxi

Hinds County 
 Cedar Lawn Cemetery, Jackson
 Greenwood Cemetery, Jackson; NRHP-listed
 Mount Olive Cemetery, Jackson; NRHP-listed

Holmes County 

 Acona Church, Cemetery, and School, near Lexington; NRHP-listed

Lauderdale County 
 Congregation Beth Israel, Meridian; NRHP-listed
 McLemore Cemetery, Meridian; NRHP-listed

Lowndes County 
 Friendship Cemetery, Columbus
 Sandfield Cemetery, Columbus

Marshall County 
 Hillcrest Cemetery, Holly Springs; NRHP-listed

Neshoba County 
 Cedarlawn Cemetery, Philadelphia

Oktibbeha County 
 Odd Fellows Cemetery, Starkville; NRHP-listed

Rankin County 
 Brandon Cemetery, Brandon; NRHP-listed

Sunflower County 
 Parchman Cemeteries at Mississippi State Penitentiary

Warren County 
 Cedar Hill Cemetery, Vicksburg
 Vicksburg National Military Park, Vicksburg; NRHP-listed

See also 
 List of cemeteries in the United States
 Pioneer cemetery 
 Mount Zion Memorial Fund, nonprofit for financial aid for rural cemeteries without grave markers in the state of Mississippi

References

Mississippi